Migi Mo Hidari Mo Shihai Suru Atama Wa Kyou Mo Niku O Kui Yodare, which translates to The Head That Controls Both Right And Left Sides Eats Meats And Slobbers Even Today, is a 2006 album by Japanese noise rockgroup Bleach. It showcases the band showing a more polished sound, with notable improvements on the guitar. It also features a bonus live DVD featuring performances at Club Fujiyama.

The title track was featured as the opening song for an episode of Mr. Robot.

Track listing

DVD tracks

References

Bleach (Japanese band) albums
2006 albums